The Nigeria Standard is a daily Nigerian newspaper owned by the Plateau State government and published by Plateau Publishing Corporation, with headquarters at Jos.

Profile 
The newspaper was established in 1972 by the Benue-Plateau State government and ceased publication in 1986. Later, in 1992, it was re-established.

The newspaper is one among the oldest news lines in Nigeria, with more than 40 years of being established. The two states—Benue and Plateau—carried out plan to re-establish the newspaper, with more than 400 million naira spent for its renovation and the acquisition of printing machines, vehicles, and the building of other branch office in Abuja, Kaduna State.

References 

1972 establishments in Nigeria
Daily newspapers published in Nigeria
English-language newspapers published in Africa
Newspapers established in 1972
Newspapers published in Plateau State